George Anthony Acosta (born January 19, 2000) is an American soccer player who plays as an attacking midfielder.

Career

Club
A Miami native, Acosta played for the Weston Academy and for the North Carolina FC U23s right before heading to Argentina signing with Boca Juniors, following his performance at the 2017 FIFA U-17 World Cup. In the South American country, he played for the Boca Juniors U20 and reserve teams. On August 28, 2019, Acosta signed with Austin Bold FC of the USL Championship. On September 1, 2019, he made his professional debut when he replaced Kris Tyrpak in the 82nd minute of the 3–0 win against Rio Grande Valley FC Toros.

Acosta joined Major League Soccer expansion side Inter Miami CF ahead of their inaugural season in 2020. Following the 2021 season, Acosta's contract option was declined by Miami.

On January 13, 2022, Acosta re-signed with Inter Miami. Acosta's contract option was declined by Miami following the 2022 season.

International
Acosta represented the United States in the 2017 FIFA U-17 World Cup. At the tournament, he played two of the five matches the Americans played at the World Cup, and scored a goal in the match against Colombia.

Personal life
Born in the United States, Acosta is of Colombian descent through his father.

References

External links
 
 
 Player's Profile at Austin Bold FC

2000 births
Living people
Association football midfielders
Soccer players from Florida
American soccer players
United States men's youth international soccer players
American sportspeople of Colombian descent
North Carolina FC U23 players
Austin Bold FC players
USL League Two players
USL Championship players
Inter Miami CF players
Inter Miami CF II players
USL League One players
Major League Soccer players
MLS Next Pro players
Sportspeople from Miami